Julia, Lady Namier (also known as Iulia de Beausobre;  Iulia Michaelovna Kazarina) (1893-1977) was a Russian writer. She wrote several works on Christian spirituality, and a biography of her husband, British historian Lewis Bernstein Namier.

Biography

Iulia Michaelovna Kazarina was born in 1893 and brought up in Saint Petersburg, Russia. Her first husband, Nicolai de Beausobre, a Russian diplomat  reportedly persecuted by the Communist authorities, died in the 1930s. Iulia herself was exiled to a concentration camp. She was ransomed by her former governess, a British woman, and migrated to Britain. She left Russia in 1934.

In Britain, she published an autobiography, The Woman Who Could Not Die (1938) and reflections on Creative Suffering (1940). She went on to publish a translation of Russian Letters of Direction by Macarius the Elder of Optino (1944), and a life of St Seraphim of Sarov, Flame in the Snow (1945), based on popular sources rather than the official hagiography.

In 1947, she married historian, Lewis Bernstein Namier, who was knighted five years later, in 1952. After his death in 1960, she wrote his biography, for which she received the James Tait Black Award in 1971. She died in 1977.

Selected works
 The Woman Who Could Not Die (1938)
 Creative Suffering (1940)
 Russian Letters of Direction by Macarius the Elder of Optino (1944)
 Flame in the Snow  A Russian Legend (1945)
 Lewis Namier: A Biography (1971)

References

Further reading
 Constance Babington Smith, Iulia de Beausobre: A Russian Christian in the West (1983)

1893 births
1977 deaths
20th-century Russian writers
20th-century British writers
British biographers
20th-century biographers
Soviet emigrants to the United Kingdom
Wives of knights